The Joint Academic Coding System (JACS) system is used by the Higher Education Statistics Agency (HESA) and the Universities and Colleges Admissions Service (UCAS) in the United Kingdom to classify academic subjects. It is due to be replaced by the Higher Education Classification of Subjects (HECoS) and the Common Aggregation Hierarchy (CAH) for the 2019/20 academic year.

A JACS code for a single subject consists of a letter and three numbers. The letter represents the broad subject classification, e.g. F for physical sciences. The first number represents the principal subject area, e.g. F3 for physics, and subsequent numbers represent further details, similar to the Dewey Decimal System. The principal subject of physics, for example, is broken into 19 detailed subjects, represented by a letter plus three numbers: e.g., F300 represents physics, F330 environmental physics and F331 atmospheric physics.

History

HESA and UCAS used to operate two different (though similar) subject coding systems - HESAcode and Standard Classification of Academic Subjects (SCAS) respectively. In 1996 a joint project was launched to bring these two systems together to create a unified structure. A project team was established with two people from each of the two organisations. The project team became known as JACS since this was an acronym of their names (Jonathan Waller and Andy Youell from HESA, Clive Sillence and Sara Goodwins from UCAS).

The first operational version (v1.7) of the Joint Academic Coding System (retaining the JACS acronym) was published in 1999 and became operational in UCAS and HESA systems for the year 2002/03.

An update exercise took place in 2005 and JACS 2 was introduced for the academic year 2007/08. JACS 3 was introduced for the 2012/13 year.

Codes
The letter codes assigned to the subject areas and the letter + number codes assigned to the principal subjects in JACS 3 are:

Y codes (combined studies) are only used at the Course level in the HESA database and are not used to describe individual modules.

JACS Codes in the UCAS system
Course codes in the UCAS system are assigned by course providers and do not necessarily correspond to the JACS codes of the course subject. UCAS course codes are four characters in length but, unlike JACS codes, may consist of any combination of letters and numbers in any order. However, historically UCAS created course codes from the JACS subject code and many institutions continue to do this, which can lead to confusion between the two concepts.

Where a course involves more than one subject, UCAS historically created the course code based on an aggregation of the JACS codes. For courses which are split 50:50 between two subjects, a code with two letters and two numbers is used, which combines the principal subject codes which would be used for the two subjects if studied as individual degrees.

Example
Consider the BSc course Mathematics and Physics:
The principal subject code for Mathematics is G1, and the principal subject code for Physics is F3.
The combined codes used are GF13 and FG31.
The codes GFD3, GF1H and GFH1 are also used.

Another example is Music and Philosophy. The principal subject codes are W3 (Music) and V5 (Philosophy). The combined codes used are  WV35 or VW35, while WV53, is also used.

The same letter can be used twice (if the two subjects are within the same general subject area), such as FF53 for Astronomy and Physics.

Courses with major/minor subjects
Coding is done differently for courses such as "Mathematics with Physics", which is not the same as "Mathematics and Physics".

The format for such courses is Y1Z9 where:
Y1 is the "major" subject which represents most of the degree course
Z9 is the "minor" subject which represents less of the course.

For example, Mathematics with Physics would be represented by G1F3, but Physics with Mathematics would be represented by F3G1. Hence the order in which the two subjects are notated was important historically.

See also
List of fields of doctoral studies

References

External links
JACS 1.7 Classification (2002/03–2006/07) from HESA
JACS 2.0 Classification (2007/08–2011/12) from HESA
JACS 3.0 Classification (since 2012/13) from HESA

Higher education in the United Kingdom
UCAS
University and college admissions